Ellen's Game of Games is an American television game show which debuted on NBC on December 18, 2017.

On January 9, 2018, NBC renewed the series for a 13-episode second season. On January 16, 2019, NBC renewed the series for a 16-episode third season. On February 18, 2020, NBC renewed the series for a 20-episode fourth season.

 In January 2022, the series was canceled after four seasons.

Series overview

Episodes

Season 1 (2017–18)

Season 2 (2018–19)

Season 3 (2020)

Season 4 (2020–21)
Due to season four being filmed during the COVID-19 pandemic there are no longer special guests for games such as Knockin' Boots, or Stink Tank, and the audience is canned. Season four also marked the start of Hotter Hands, a multiple choice answer game.

Ratings

References

Lists of American reality television series episodes